Folger Rock is a rock lying  north of Harmony Point, Nelson Island, in the South Shetland Islands. It was named by the UK Antarctic Place-Names Committee in 1961 for Tristan Folger, the Master of the American sealing vessel William and Nancy from Nantucket, which visited the South Shetland Islands in 1820–21, operating from nearby Harmony Cove.

References

External links
 SCAR Composite Antarctic Gazetteer.

Rock formations of Antarctica